Rose A. Walker (1879–1942), was an Australian painter and miniaturist. She was a founding member of the Twenty Melbourne Painters Society.

Biography
Walker was born in Walhalla in 1879. She attended the Bendigo School of Mines where she studied under Arthur T. Woodward. She then moved to Melbourne where she studied with Max Meldrum.

Walker exhibited her work around Melbourne at the Victorian Artists Society, and the Athenaeum Gallery. She showed her work under the name "Mrs George Hartrick" after she wed.

She was a member of the Victorian Artists Society, the Twenty Melbourne Painters Society and the Melbourne Society of Women Painters and Sculptors.

She died in 1942.

In 2013 Walker was included in the exhibition Towards Perth: Western Australian Women Artists Before 1950 at the Lawrence Wilson Art Gallery in Crawley, Australia.

References

1879 births
1942 deaths
19th-century Australian women artists
20th-century Australian women artists
20th-century Australian artists
Australian artists
Artists from Victoria (Australia)